Homoeodera major, the greater fungus weevil is a species of beetle belonging to the family Anthribidae.

References

Beetles described in 1887
Anthribidae